Bladder training, also known as scheduled voiding and bladder re-education is urinating at specific times of the day. It is used as a first line treatment of overactive bladder on mixed urinary incontinence.

References

Incontinence